These are the Kowloon East results of the 2004 Hong Kong legislative election. The election was held on 12 September 2004 and all 5 seats in Kowloon East where consisted of Wong Tai Sin District and Kwun Tong District were contested. All four incumbents were elected with famous pro-democrat radio host Albert Cheng won a new seat with Andrew To of The Frontier on a joint ticket.

Overall results
Before election:

Change in composition:

Candidates list

See also
Legislative Council of Hong Kong
Hong Kong legislative elections
2004 Hong Kong legislative election

References

2004 Hong Kong legislative election